Aldo Addobbati was an Italian film producer. In 1968 he produced Gianfranco Parolini's Se incontri Sartana prega per la tua morte, a western starring Gianni Garko, William Berger, Fernando Sancho and Klaus Kinski. He followed this by producing another of Parolini's and Kinski's in 1969 with the war picture 5 per l'inferno and he also co-produced the western Sono Sartana, il vostro becchino with Paolo Moffa. The film was directed by Giuliano Carnimeo and starred Gianni Garko.

Filmography
The Fantastic Three (1967)
Se incontri Sartana prega per la tua morte (1968)
5 per l'inferno (1969)
Dio perdoni la mia pistola (1969)
Sono Sartana, il vostro becchino (1969)
Afrika (1973)

References

Italian film producers
Living people
Year of birth missing (living people)